Spain participated in the Eurovision Song Contest 2004 with an entry selected through the third series of the reality-show Operación Triunfo. Ramón with the song "Para llenarme de ti", composed by Kike Santander, was chosen through televoting by the Spanish public. At the Eurovision final, Ramón placed 10th with 87 points.

Before Eurovision

Operación Triunfo 

The third season of Operación Triunfo was broadcast from the Mediapark Studios in Sant Just Desvern, Barcelona and was hosted by Carlos Lozano. After the regular final of Operación Triunfo that took place on 21 December 2003 (where Vicente Seguí was declared the overall winner of the season), the top four contestants - Vicente, Ramón, Miguel and Davinia - qualified for the Eurovision phase of the contest, which consisted of two rounds and a final.

First round
In the first round on 14 January 2004, three songs were assigned to each contestant among those submitted to national broadcaster TVE, making a total of twelve songs. A jury eliminated one of the songs assigned to each artist, leaving a total of eight.

Second Round 
In the second round on 21 January 2004, a finalist song was chosen for each contestant through televoting. The four songs that participated in the final were "Cómo quieres que te quiera" by Davinia, "Muéveme" by Miguel, "Para llenarme de ti" by Ramón, and "Se me va la vida" by Vicente.

Final 
The final took place on 28 January 2004. At the close of voting, "Para llenarme de ti" performed by Ramón was awarded first place with 38.8% of the vote.

At Eurovision
Spain automatically qualified for the grand final, on 12 May 2004; as part of the "Big Four". During the placement draw, it was determined that Spain would perform 1st. On 12 May, Spain placed 10th with 87 points.

Voting

Points awarded to Spain

Points awarded by Spain

References 

2004
Countries in the Eurovision Song Contest 2004
Eurovision
Eurovision